The Children's Trust is the UK's leading charity for children with brain injury.

The Children's Trust runs a range of specialist care, education and therapy services for children and young people from across the UK, including the UK's largest rehabilitation centre for children with acquired brain injury (ABI) and is based at Tadworth Court, Tadworth, Surrey within the M25 motorway.

The Children's Trust's celebrity Ambassadors are David Walliams, Richard Hammond, Phil Tufnell, Joely Richardson, Adam Hills, Jenni Falconer, Amanda Burton, Elaine Paige, Holly Valance, Sophia Warner, Nicholas Owen and Jacqueline Gold.

In 2012 The Children's Trust launched an online support centre for families of children affected by acquired brain injury - The Brain Injury Hub. This website offers a wealth of practical advice and information about a condition that's often misunderstood. There is also an online forum giving families the opportunity to share their stories and experiences.

In May 2022 a coroner criticised The Children's Trust over the death of a five-year-old while under its care.
An inquest concluded Connor Wellsted died in 2017 following "entrapment by a loose cot bumper" at the Children's Trust facility in Tadworth, Surrey.
Coroner Dr Karen Henderson also criticised the trust for what she said was a "lack of transparency" over the death.https://www.bbc.com/news/uk-england-surrey-61494777
The Children's Trust is a UK registered charity, number 288018.

Services
The Children's Trust's services include:
 Residential rehabilitation for children with an acquired brain injury
 Therapy-led support in the community for children with an acquired brain injury
 Special education for pupils with profound and multiple learning difficulties, or PMLD, at The Children's Trust School, Tadworth
 Residential short breaks
 Transitional care for children who are technology dependent (e.g. require long-term ventilation or have a tracheostomy)
 Palliative care
 The Brain Injury Hub (www.braininjuryhub.co.uk) - an information website and discussion forum for parents of children with acquired brain injury as well as teachers and health professionals.

Awards
Recent awards won by The Children's Trust:
 Quality Improvement Award (Top Hospitals 2019)
 Institute of Fundraising Best use of data and insight in a small to medium charity (Insight in Fundraising Awards 2019)
 Highly Commended, 2019 BMA Patient Information Awards for Brain Injury Community Service animation and leaflet. 
 Highly Commended, 2019 BMA Patient Information Awards, Concussion in children and young people booklet
 Winner 2018 BMA Patient Information Awards User Engagement Award 
 Charity Shop of the Year (Charity Retail Awards)

History

From 1927 until 1983, Tadworth Court was the country branch of Great Ormond Street Hospital. In 1984, the Department of Health transferred management control to the newly created charity, The Children's Trust.

Tadworth Court was the manor house of the manor of Tadworth which lay within the parish of Banstead, by Banstead Downs, a horse-racing racecourse in the 17th century. Banstead was well known as an airing place at this period, where Londoners sought fresh air, being 600 feet above sea level. The attractions of Epsom Spa to the west prompted the first settlements other than isolated farmhouses on this part of the widest section of the North Downs stretching from Banstead village to Walton-on-the-Hill to the south.

Tadworth Court on the south of the site is a listed building for architecture in the highest category as a country house of circa 1700, with "rustic quoins, stone dressings (renderings)..steep (and richly decorated) pediment....high panelling and rococo plasterwork...Boxed room with early C10 panelling,". Nikolaus Pevsner described it as a ’splendid house’ and ’one of the most elegant in the whole country’. He was amazed that such a house so close to London was virtually unknown — no pictures of the house are known before the 20th century.

The owners of the house: The first owner, Leonard Wessel, a merchant,  purchased the estate in 1694. He was Sheriff of the County in 1700 and a Member of Parliament in 1701. Whilst of a Dutch family, his great grandfather was born in England in 1557. Recent work to the house revealed that it does not incorporate an earlier building, but in common with all buildings of this period contains some reused beams due to the growing shortage of timber. 1694 is the likely construction date of the house and by 1698 the Banstead Court Rolls record that Wessel applied for leave ’to plant rows of trees on the Heath, fronting his dwelling house and leading towards the Warren.’ One of these, a large poplar, survived until the 19th century.

Wessel died in 1708. The house appears on contemporary maps, and Celia Fiennes in 1712 describes it as one of ’several good houses in or about Epsham’, though by then in the possession of Sir Thomas Scawen, Alderman of London, his brother-in-law.

References

External links
Official website
The Brain Injury Hub
Josh's Story (as seen on BBC's Children in Need)
BBC TV news story about a girl who has received residential rehabilitation at The Children's Trust following a stroke aged six
Article from The Guardian newspaper about the highly specialised education offered by St Margaret's School at The Children's Trust
Article from The Sunday Times Magazine about The Children's Trust's services

Charities for disabled people based in the United Kingdom
Children's charities based in the United Kingdom
Grade I listed buildings in Surrey